Hesham is a common male given name and surname. In Arabic it means "generous", though in some instances there may not be any connection with the Arabic. It is not to be confused with the similar-looking but unrelated name Hashim "هاشم".

Notable people with the name include:

Given name 
Hesham Hanafy (born 1973), Egyptian footballer
Hesham Mohamed Hussain (born 1971), Saudi Arabian citizen
Hesham Ismail (born 1969), American football player
Hesham Mesbah (born 1982), Egyptian judoka
Hesham Mohamed (born 1990), Egyptian footballer
Hesham Mohammed (born 1974), Iraqi footballer
Hesham Qandil (born 1962), Egyptian engineer
Hesham Ali Salem (born 1981), Libyan basketball player
Hesham Selim (1958–2022), Egyptian actor
Hesham Shaban (born 1980), Libyan footballer
Hesham Shehab (born 1988), Bahraini swimmer
Hesham Tillawi, Palestinian-American writer
Hesham Abdul Wahab (born 1990), Indian music composer
Hesham Yehia (born 1993), Egyptian boxer
Hesham Yakan (born 1962), Egyptian footballer
Hesham Youssef, Egyptian diplomat

Middle name 
Mazen Hesham Ga Sabry (born 1994), Egyptian squash player

Surname 
Frank Hesham (1879–1915), English footballer
Youssef Hesham (born 1985), Egyptian film director

See also
Hisham (name)
Hicham